Christopher Pell Liddell  (born 24 April 1958) is a New Zealand-American businessperson who served as Chief Financial Officer of Microsoft, the Vice Chairman of General Motors, Senior Vice President and CFO of International Paper, Director and Chairman of Xero and the White House Deputy Chief of Staff in the Trump Administration.

Liddell has been active in a number of philanthropic projects, mostly in his native New Zealand and in the 2016 New Year Honours, he was appointed a Companion of the New Zealand Order of Merit for services to business and philanthropy.

Biography 

Liddell was born in Matamata, New Zealand, the youngest of five siblings. His father was a school teacher and died while Liddell was young. His mother supported Liddell and his siblings by working a variety of jobs, including at Smith & Caughey's in Auckland. Liddell received his secondary education at Mount Albert Grammar School. He holds a Bachelor of Engineering degree with honors from the University of Auckland and a Master of Philosophy degree from Worcester College, Oxford University. He was named one of Auckland University's Distinguished Alumni in 2003.

Family
He has been married to Renee Harbers Liddell, his third wife, since 2011.

Career

Corporate 

In 1983, Liddell took up a position at investment bank Jarden & Co which would morph into Credit Suisse Boston's operation in New Zealand and finally Jarden today. He rose to the role of joint-CEO and managing director of CS First Boston NZ.

In 1995, he joined Carter Holt Harvey as chief financial officer. Four years later he was chief executive officer - the first New Zealander to be appointed by majority shareholder International Paper, which had previously sent Americans David Oskin and John Faraci down to head the company. When Liddell left Carter Holt Harvey, the company was New Zealand's largest forest owner managing around 330,000 hectares and the country's second largest listed company by market capitalization, with sales of NZ$3.75 billion.

From 2003, Liddell served as CFO of Carter Holt Harvey's parent company International Paper until 2005. During his tenure, Liddell was credited with building a world-class finance function that redesigned and substantially improved the company’s business resource allocation and internal control processes; was actively involved in the company’s cost-reduction initiatives; and drove and managed business strategy, including several important M&A transactions. "Chris has played a pivotal role as the chief executive officer of Carter Holt Harvey, and more recently, as the chief financial officer of International Paper. We will very much miss having Chris on our leadership team", stated then CEO John V. Faraci in an announcement.

Liddell was a senior vice president and CFO of Microsoft, where, from 2005 to December 2009, he was responsible for leading their worldwide finance organization. "Chris brings great talent and skills both in finance and in business leadership," said Steve Ballmer, then chief executive officer at Microsoft. "Having been both CEO and CFO of international companies gives him the ability to contribute broadly to our finance, operations and business strategy."

In 2010, he was named the New Zealand Business Leader of the Year by the New Zealand Herald.

Liddell served as Vice Chairman and Chief Financial Officer at General Motors, where he managed the company’s $23 billion IPO in November 2010, which, at that time, which was the largest public offering in history.

In 2014, Xero, the cloud-based accounting software developer appointed Liddell as its new chairman. Liddell resigned from the New Zealand-based company to take on a new role in United States president-elect Donald Trump's administration. Xero's chief executive and founder Rod Drury congratulated Liddell on his new role and thanked him for his contribution to the company over the past three years.

From 2014 to 2016, he worked as the CFO of Endeavor, a privately held company in the media, sports and entertainment industry.

Government 
In 2012, Liddell was executive director of transition planning for the Romney Presidential Campaign.

In January 2017, he was appointed as Assistant to the President for Strategic Initiatives in Donald Trump's White House, He was appointed to the Office of American Innovation (OAI) when it was established on 27 March 2017, where he was focusing on federal IT modernization. He opted to receive the minimum salary required to get health insurance, $30,000. He was also appointed Director of the American Technology Council  and was a member of the White House Coronavirus Task Force. In March 2018 he was picked to replace Rick Dearborn as White House Deputy Chief of Staff for Policy. In his White House roles he has coordinated administration policy around a number of technology issues, in particular relating to cyber security, and to the Industries of the Future, which include Artificial Intelligence, 5G, Advanced Manufacturing, Quantum Computing and Synthetic Biology.

He served as the White House lead for the Trillion Trees Initiative, part of the Trillion Tree Campaign, which aims to conserve, restore, and grow a trillion trees around the world by 2030.  President Trump signed an Executive Order "Establishing the One Trillion Trees Interagency Council" in October 2020. Liddell oversaw the Administration's contribution, and represented the White House during its engagements with 1t.org and the 1t.org Stakeholder Council.

In October 2020 he was nominated by Donald Trump to be the next Secretary-General of the OECD. It was unclear if Joe Biden would have supported his nomination progressing.

On 20 January 2021, the OECD confirmed that Liddell had withdrawn his nomination to serve as the Secretary-General of the OECD.

New Zealand's government did not make a decision to support the nomination. The left-wing Green Party of Aotearoa New Zealand said he should be rejected as his work for Trump  had eroded multilateral approaches in the Paris Agreement and the World Health Organization. The right-wing New Zealand National Party said it would be in New Zealand's interest to have a "boy from Matamata" in the role, but later reversed their support for Liddell.

Prior to the 2021 inauguration Liddell called for legislation that "allows a provisional ascertainment to occur so that an incoming administration [and] the president-elect can get security briefings for a lot of the time-sensitive issues regardless of whether the formal election has been settled or not."

Liddell reportedly considered resigning after the January 6 United States Capitol attack in Washington D.C., but announced he would stay on to ensure a smooth transition to President elect Joe Biden. Liddell had a key role in the transition.

David Marchick elaborated on Liddell’s role in the tumult of the translation in his book The Peaceful Transfer of Power: An Oral History of America’s Presidential Transitions, noting that while Presidential transitions are incredibly complicated endeavors in the best of circumstances, Liddell had “perhaps the worst job in Washington” in executing the faithful implementation of the Presidential Transition Act “for a president who neither wanted to leave nor accepted the election results.”

Author, documentary filmmaker, and White House historian Chris Whipple, in a preview chapter on the transition from his book on the Biden White House, The Fight of His Life, published in Vanity Fair, said that Liddell “helped make the transfer of power possible, becoming an unlikely leader of a plot to save democracy.”

Affiliations 
In 2001, Liddell was on the conference committee for the Catching the Knowledge Wave project, one of the biggest meeting of minds to take place in New Zealand history. The conference hosted about 450 academics, officials, politicians, economists and business leaders who discussed ways of lifting New Zealand’s economic performance. Led by the New Zealand Prime Minister and the Vice Chancellor of the University of Auckland, it was a catalyst for the realization that New Zealand could no longer remain primarily a producer of agricultural  commodities but instead transform itself to a high-value, knowledge-based economy.

Liddell is founding chairman of the Next Foundation, a $72 million dollar foundation in New Zealand focused on environmental and education projects. Next has funded projects such as Project Taranaki Mounga, a ten-year project to control pests and re-introduce nature birds in the 34,000 ha of Egmont National Park, and Predator Free Wellington City, a partnership to make Wellington the first predator free capital in the world.
Liddell was a signatory to the Tomorrow Accord, an agreement between the New Zealand government and NEXT to focus on large scale ecological restoration projects, and commit to maintaining their ecological benefits in perpetuity.

Liddell has served as director of the New Zealand Rugby Union. He spearheaded and funded a campaign to assemble and publicly display the most important All Black jerseys in the team's 120-year history.
	
In 2017, Liddell and his brother, John, donated $1 million to Mount Albert Grammar primarily to fund teacher and pupil scholarships. Later that year, Liddell donated $450,000 to Auckland University to fund a postgraduate scholarship to Worcester College, Oxford.

In 2021, Liddell joined the Blavatnik School of Government on a Transformational Leadership Fellowship. In 2022, Karthik Ramanna and Liddell raised philanthropic funding to help drive further carbon accounting pilots of the E-liability accounting method, resulting in the creation of the E-liability Institute, where Liddell serves as Chairman.

He is a member of the Council on Foreign Relations.

References

External links

1958 births
Alumni of Worcester College, Oxford
Chief financial officers
Companions of the New Zealand Order of Merit
General Motors executives
Living people
New Zealand chief executives
People educated at Mount Albert Grammar School
People from Matamata
Trump administration personnel
University of Auckland alumni
White House Deputy Chiefs of Staff
New Zealand emigrants to the United States